Nicholas David Weir (born 20 November 1964) is an English entertainer and presenter. He was the second presenter of Catchphrase and is currently the Senior Vice President of Entertainment for Royal Caribbean International. He presented four game shows for ITV productions including Catchphrase.

Early life 
Nick Weir was raised by his parents Leonard and Beverly Weir along with brother Simon in Sydney, New South Wales, Australia. Both of his parents had formerly worked in cruise ship entertainment. His father was a stage actor and singer as well as a cruise director and his mother was a singer who entertained on cruises.

Entertainment career 
Weir began his entertainment career on cruise ships, as a singer and comedian before moving to television. In 1997, he presented the regional sports game show On the Ball in the Granada ITV region. In 1998 he presented the nationally broadcast ITV daytime game show Waffle and also co-hosted Grudge Match with Lisa Rogers from 1999 to 2000. At the time of which he was presenting Catchphrase, he lived in Brighton, East Sussex.

In 2000, Weir replaced Roy Walker as the host of the TV game show Catchphrase. During his first series, he broke his foot during a recording of the show by falling down the stairs as he made his entrance to the studio floor, the usual entrance he would do in every episode of his run prior to the injury and after. The incident was edited out but was shown in a later show to explain why he was in a cast and on crutches. He continued to present his first series of Catchphrase while his foot healed, wearing a cast throughout many episodes of the show. He left the show after three series.

Between December 2001 and January 2002, he appeared in the play Aladdin as the character of the same name in the Hexagon in Reading, Berkshire. 

Weir presented Catchphrase until 2002, following which, the show moved to daytime and former Blue Peter presenter Mark Curry took over the show for a final 2002 series.

Weir also appeared as a contestant or guest on several other game shows. He was a contestant in a December 1997 episode of Give Us a Clue and appeared in Blankety Blank in 2001. Archive footage of Weir featured on ITV's 2014 series Come on Down! The Game Show Story.

Cruise and entertainment consulting 
Following Catchphrase, Weir served as entertainment consultant on board the Celebrity Eclipse as well as other Solstice Class ships, Celebrity Cruises' newest line of vessels. His consulting firm, based in Las Vegas and Miami, helped launch all five Solstice Class ships for Celebrity Cruises and designed the original entertainment programming. Because he had previous experience as a Cruise Director, Weir coordinated the entertainment programs, naming ceremonies and media events in the position of Cruise Director for the first few weeks of each ship's inaugural season. Weir also led the production of the documentary "The Making of Celebrity Reflection - The Fifth in Class" which captured the making of the vessels over an 18 month period.

Clients of Weir's consulting firm include the Las Vegas Chamber of Commerce, The Las Vegas Convention and Visitors Authority, MGM, Syco Television, Andre Agassi Foundation, Emeril Lagasse, Celebrity Cruises, Royal Caribbean International, Costa Cruises.

His brother, Simon, also works together with him on the same ship cruise, Royal Caribbean International; however, his brother works as a Director of Hotel Operations.

Vice President of Entertainment at Royal Caribbean 
Weir was appointed Vice President of Entertainment by Royal Caribbean on 18 September 2013, following the departure of Peter Compton. Royal Caribbean wanted Weir's combination of stage and managerial experience to push larger Vegas-style productions aboard its ships. Since becoming the vice president, Weir has overseen the launch of the Two70° theatre in the back end of the ship in the Quantum class. He has also overseen two new stage shows, Mamma Mia! and Sonic Odyssey.

List of game shows
Lucky Numbers (1995, not broadcast pilot)
On the Ball (1997)
Waffle (1998)
Grudge Match (1999–2000)
Catchphrase (2000–2004)
Lily Savage's Blankety Blank (2001 & 2002, as guest)

References

External links

British game show hosts
Living people
1964 births
English people of Australian descent
People from Hatfield, Hertfordshire
People from Sydney